Gniewino  (Kashubian: Gniéwino; formerly ) is a village in Wejherowo County, Pomeranian Voivodeship, in northern Poland. It is the seat of the gmina (administrative district) called Gmina Gniewino.

A little to the east of Gniewino lies the Kashubian Eye Complex, a tourism and recreation complex centred on a 44 metre tall viewing tower.

For details of the history of the region, see History of Pomerania.

The village has a population of 1,710. There is a large wind farm.

Gallery

References

External links
 Tourism in Gniewino
 Kashubian Eye Complex

Villages in Wejherowo County
Kashubia